Stelis scabrida is a species of flowering plant in the family Orchidaceae, native to the Leeward Islands and the Windward Islands. It was first described by John Lindley in 1840.

References

scabrida
Flora of the Leeward Islands
Flora of the Windward Islands
Plants described in 1840